The 15th Pan American Games were held in Rio de Janeiro, Brazil from 13 July to 29 July 2007.

Medals

Bronze

Men's Team Competition: Nicaragua national baseball team

Men's Featherweight (– 57 kg): Orlando Rizo

See also
Nicaragua at the 2008 Summer Olympics

External links
Rio 2007 Official website

Nations at the 2007 Pan American Games
P
2007